The Commodity Classification Standards Board (CCSB) develops and maintains National Motor Freight Classification (NMFC). The CCSB is an autonomous board of three to seven full-time employees of the National Motor Freight Traffic Association (NMFTA). The CCSB's staff includes a lawyer and a packaging consultant.

The National Motor Freight Traffic Association hosts three meetings a year at which the CCSB considers proposals to amend the National Motor Freight Classification and the association considers topics of interest to its members.

See also
Freight
Less than truckload shipping

References

External links
NFMTA Website

Organizations based in Virginia
Organizations based in Alexandria, Virginia